Helbakko is a Syrian village in the Jableh District in Latakia Governorate. According to the Syria Central Bureau of Statistics (CBS), Helbakko had a population of 292 in the 2004 census.

References

Alawite communities in Syria
Populated places in Jableh District